The 1924 North Dakota Flickertails football team, also known as the Nodaks, was an American football team that represented the University of North Dakota as a member of the North Central Conference (NCC) during the 1924 college football season. In their sixth year under head coach Paul J. Davis, the Flickertails compiled a 2–8 record (1–4 against NCC opponents), finished in a tie for seventh place out of nine teams in the NCC, and were outscored by a total of 167 to 32.

Schedule

References

North Dakota
North Dakota Fighting Hawks football seasons
North Dakota Flickertails football